Slávia TU Košice is a Slovak football team, based in the town of Košice, that competes in the 3. Liga, the 3rd tier of Slovak football.

Current squad
Updated 18 July 2020

Colours
Club colours are grey and white.

External links
Official club website 
  
Club profile at Futbalnet.sk 
Club profile at Soccerway

References

Football clubs in Slovakia